Steven Peter Russell Rose (born 4 July 1938) is an English neuroscientist, author, and social commentator. He is emeritus professor of biology and neurobiology at the Open University and Gresham College, London.

Early life
Born in London, United Kingdom, he was brought up as an Orthodox Jew. Rose says that he decided to become an atheist when he was eight years old. He went to a direct grant school in northwest London which operated a numerus clausus restricting the numbers of Jewish students. He studied biochemistry at King's College, Cambridge, and neurochemistry at the Institute of Psychiatry, King's College London.

Academic career
Following a Fellowship at New College, Oxford, and a Medical Research Council research post, he was appointed to the professorship of biology at the newly instituted Open University in 1969. At the time he was Britain's youngest full professor and chair of department. At the Open University he established the Brain Research Group, within which he and his colleagues investigated the biological processes involved in memory formation and treatments for Alzheimer's disease on which he has published some 300 research papers and reviews. He has written several popular science books and regularly writes for The Guardian newspaper and the London Review of Books. From 1999 to 2002, he gave public lectures as Professor of Physick (Genetics and Society) with his wife, the feminist sociologist Hilary Rose at Gresham College, London. His work has won him numerous medals and prizes including the Biochemical Society medal for communication in science and the prestigious Edinburgh Medal in 2004. His book The Making of Memory won the Rhone-Poulenc Science Book Prize in 1993.
In 2012 the British Neuroscience Association gave him a lifetime award for "Outstanding contributions to neuroscience."

Together with Hilary Rose he was a founder member of the British Society for Social Responsibility in Science in the 1960s, and more recently they have been instrumental in calling for a boycott of Israeli academic institutions for as long as Israel continues its occupation of the Palestinian Territories, on the grounds of Israeli academics' close relationship with the IDF. An open letter  initiated by Steven and Hilary Rose, and also signed by 123 other academics was published in The Guardian on 6 April 2002. In 2004 Hilary Rose and he were the founding members of the British Committee for the Universities of Palestine.

Rose was for several years a regular panellist on BBC Radio 4's ethics debating series The Moral Maze. He is a Distinguished Supporter of Humanists UK. He was part of the Royal Society's working group producing their Brain Waves modules on the state of neuroscience and its social framing, and was a member of the Nuffield Council on Bioethics Working Party on Novel Neurotechnologies. His recent books with Hilary Rose include Alas Poor Darwin: Arguments against Evolutionary Psychology, in 2012, Genes, Cells and Brains: the Promethean promises of the new biology (Verso), described by Guardian reviewer Steven Poole as 'fascinating, lucid and angry'  with a 'lethally impressive hit ratio' and most recently Can Neuroscience Change Our Minds? (Polity, 2016). His audio-autobiography forms part of the British Library's National Life Stories Collection of distinguished scientists. The sociologist Nikolas Rose is his younger brother. Hilary and he have two sons. He remains an atheist.

Critique of genetic determinism 
With Richard Lewontin and Leon Kamin, Rose championed the "radical science movement". The three criticized sociobiology, evolutionary psychology, and adaptationism, most prominently in the book Not in Our Genes (1984), laying out their opposition to Sociobiology (E. O. Wilson, 1975), The Selfish Gene (Richard Dawkins, 1976), and other works promoting an evolutionary explanation for human social behaviour. Not in Our Genes described Dawkins as "the most reductionist of sociobiologists". In retort, Dawkins wrote that the book practices a straw man  fallacy by distorting arguments in terms of genetics to "an idiotic travesty (that the properties of a complex whole are simply the sum of those same properties in the parts)", and accused the authors of giving "ideology priority over truth". Rose replied in the second edition of his book Lifelines. Rose wrote further works in this area: in 2000 he jointly edited with the sociologist Hilary Rose, a critique of evolutionary psychology entitled Alas, Poor Darwin: Arguments Against Evolutionary Psychology. In 2006 he wrote a paper dismissing classical heritability estimates as useful scientific measures in respect of human populations especially in the context of IQ.

Rose wrote the introduction of The Richness of Life (2007) by the prominent American paleontologist, evolutionary biologist, and historian of science, Stephen Jay Gould.

Bibliography

Books (for selected papers see website Stevenroseonline.net)
Chemical and Biological Warfare, 1968, Chambers Harrap Publishers, 
Science and Society, with Hilary Rose, Penguin, 1969
The Conscious Brain, 1973, 
Radicalisation of Science, with Hilary Rose, 1976, Macmillan, 
Political Economy of Science: Ideology of/in the Natural Science, Editor with Hilary Rose, 1976, Macmillan, 
Towards a Liberatory Biology (Editor) 1981, Allison & Busby, 
Against Biological Determinism (Editor), 1982, Schocken, 
Not in Our Genes (With Richard Lewontin & Leon Kamin) 1984, 
No Fire, No Thunder: Threat of Chemical and Biological Weapons, with Sean Murphy and Alistair Hay, 1984, Pluto Press, 
The Chemistry of Life, 1991 (first published in 1966), 
The Making of Memory, 1992, 
Alas, Poor Darwin: Arguments against Evolutionary Psychology, with Hilary Rose, 2000, 
Lifelines, 2005, 
The 21st Century Brain, 2005, 
The Future of the Brain: The Promise and Perils of Tomorrow's Neuroscience, 2005, 
Genes, Cells and Brains: Bioscience's Promethean Promises, with Hilary Rose, 2012, Verso, 
Can Neuroscience Change Our Minds? , with Hilary Rose, 2016, Polity,

See also
Academic boycotts of Israel
List of British Jewish scientists
Stephen Jay Gould
Richard Lewontin
Richard Levins

References

External links
Steven Rose Online
Profile on The Third Culture at edge.org
Debate with Steven Pinker at edge.org
Biography at Counterbalance Foundation
Steven Rose articles at The Guardian

1938 births
Living people
Academics of the Open University
Academics of the University of London
Alumni of King's College London
Anti-Zionism in the United Kingdom
20th-century British biologists
21st-century British biologists
British humanists
British science writers
British social commentators
English atheists
English Marxists
English neuroscientists
English Orthodox Jews
Jewish anti-Zionism
Jewish atheists
Jewish scientists
Memory researchers
Professors of Gresham College
Race and intelligence controversy
English republicans